Cheena Thaana 001 is a 2007 Tamil-language action comedy film starring Prasanna and Sheela. It's a remake of the 2003 Malayalam film, C.I.D. Moosa.

Plot
Tamizharasu wants to become a cop, but the arrogant police officers Inspector Parameshwaran and AC Gowrishankar ensure that he does not succeed. Meanwhile, he discovers a plot to assassinate the Governor by the terrorist Gulshan Baba, and he complains it to Gowrishankar, but discovers that he is also a member of the plot. So he forms a detective agency and starts cracking the plot, and how he succeeds in it with the help of his father, his father's Friend and, of course, with his friend Cheenichamy, who is also a thief, forms the rest of the story.

Cast

 Prasanna as Tamizharasu
 Sheela as Priya
 Vadivelu as Seenichamy
 Manivannan as Inspector Parameshwaran
 Delhi Ganesh as Head Constable Ezhumalai Tamizharasu's father
 Ilavarasu as Tamizharasu's father's friend
 Riyaz Khan as ACP Gowrishankar
 Visu as Vishwanath Reddy, former High Court Judge current Governor of Tamil Nadu
 Nizhalgal Ravi as Vijayaraghavan IPS, the Chennai City Police Commissioner
 Shanthi Williams as Governor's wife
 T. P. Gajendran as a Madman
 Muthukaalai as Omapodi
 Kazan Khan as Terrorist Leader Gulshan Baba
 Satya Prakash as Terrorist
 Bhuvana
 Reena as Tamizharasu's Mother
 Simran Khan (Item number)
 Livingston as CID Aanthaikannan (Special Appearance)

Soundtrack
Lyrics were written by Piraisoodan, Snehan, Yugabharathi, Krithiya and Lakshmi Priyan.

Reception

Indiaglitz wrote, "Prasanna after a series of serious portrayals in his earlier films opts for a laugh-riot role. He is at his best in comedy and stunt sequences. However, walking away with all honors is Vadivelu. Playing Prasanna's close aide, he brings the roof down with laughter. His body language and dialogue delivery provides instant laughter."

Behindwoods wrote, "Prasanna has come up with a good performance. Vadivelu and his team guarantee the audience with clean comedy and he rocks as always. The sequences where he encounters a mottai need to be seen to be enjoyed. Visu who comes as a Governor delivers a few orders which are certainly rib ticklers of the highest order. Songs are just average. Many scenes from Seena Thaana are guaranteed to find themselves in the comedy programs of television."

Sify wrote, "The humour here is the "Tom & Jerry", one-man- upmanship type. Prasanna wants to become a cop, but the comedians are determined that he does not get selected. So it becomes a merry-go-round of our hero Vs team of comedians- Vadivelu, Mannivannan, comic villain Riaz Khan and assorted 'terrorist' baddies who want to kill the governor, Visu. Sheela is there for the songs tuned by Deva."

Bharatstudent.com wrote, "Prasanna excels both in the action scenes as well as comedy scenes. His comedy timing is also good. Vadivelu literally steals the show with his comedy. Sheela has a brief role. She acts in a couple of songs and then disappears. Visu, Riyaz Khan, Kasan Khan, Ilavarasu, Delhi Ganesh and others go about their jobs in a neat manner. Deva's music is good. The film is a good entertainer and can be enjoyed by both adults and children alike.".

References

External links
 

2007 films
2007 action comedy films
2000s Tamil-language films
Indian action comedy films
Indian slapstick comedy films
Indian crime comedy films
Tamil remakes of Malayalam films
Films scored by Deva (composer)
Films directed by T. P. Gajendran
2000s crime comedy films